Deer Creek Hot Springs (also known as Bigelow Hot Springs) is a hot spring along the McKenzie River in the Cascade Range of western Oregon, United States.

When the McKenzie river is high (winter and spring), the pools are combined into a single pool and inundated with cold water. The springs are located south of the McKenzie River Bridge, in a fee-free day-use area open from sunrise to sunset.

References 

Hot springs of Oregon
Rivers of Lane County, Oregon
Willamette National Forest